Josef Hojný (born 2 December 1958) is a Czech sports shooter. He competed in the mixed trap event at the 1980 Summer Olympics.

References

External links
 

1958 births
Living people
People from Smiřice
Czech male sport shooters
Olympic shooters of Czechoslovakia
Shooters at the 1980 Summer Olympics
Sportspeople from the Hradec Králové Region